Anisul Huq (born 30 March 1956) is a Bangladeshi lawyer and politician.  He has been the Bangladesh government's Minister for Law, Justice and Parliamentary Affairs since 2014.

Early life and education 
Anisul Huq was the son of Serajul Huq, a lawyer and a former Member of parliament. He took his pre-primary education in viqarunnisa school. He was educated at Saint Joseph Higher Secondary School (Dhaka), the University of Dhaka (BA (Hons) English Literature; Masters in English Literature; LLB) and King's College London (LLM).

Career

Law profession 
Huq was enrolled as a lawyer in the Dhaka district bar in November 1985 and in the High Court Division of the Supreme Court of Bangladesh in November 1987. In 2001 he was enrolled in the Appellate Division of the Supreme Court of Bangladesh as a lawyer and became a senior advocate of the Supreme Court of Bangladesh in 2010.

On his father's death, Anisul Huq became the chief special prosecutor for both the assassination of Sheikh Mujibur Rahman case and the Jail killing. It was under his counsel that the assassination of Sheikh Mujibur Rahman case was completed and a judgment was delivered by the apex court. Huq was also the chief counsel and special prosecutor for the Anti-Corruption Commission of Bangladesh, and the chief prosecutor for the Peelkhana carnage case which relates to the mutiny of the Bangladesh Rifles in 2009. This case was also completed successfully under his leadership.

The late Advocate Serajul Huq and his son Anisul Huq both are senior advocates of the Supreme Court of Bangladesh, acted as counsel for most of the important, leading and sensitive criminal cases of the country during the 1980-2014 period.

Politics
In the general elections held on 5 January 2014, Huq was elected as a Member of Parliament from the Brahmanbaria-4 (Kasba-Akhaura) constituency as a candidate of the Bangladesh Awami League. He took the oath as a Member of Parliament on 9 January 2014. Thereafter he was inducted in the cabinet as a minister on 12 January 2014 and was allocated the portfolio of Ministry of Law, Justice and Parliamentary Affairs.

In the 11th National Parliamentary Election held on 30 December 2018, Huq was again elected to Parliament from the same constituency, as a candidate of the Awami League. He took his oath as a Member of Parliament on 3 January 2019. He was further appointed as the Minister for the Ministry of Law, Justice and Parliamentary Affairs and took that oath on 7 January 2019 as Minister. He is the first person to be Minister of the Ministry of Law, Justice and Parliamentary Affairs for two consecutive terms for Bangladesh.

Personal life 
Huq was married to Nur Amtullah Rina Huq on 18 December 1987. She died on 2 January 1991 in a road accident. His mother, Jahanara Huq, was the first chairman of Citizens Bank Bangladesh.

References

1956 births
Living people
University of Dhaka alumni
Alumni of King's College London
Awami League politicians
10th Jatiya Sangsad members
State Ministers of Law, Justice and Parliamentary Affairs
11th Jatiya Sangsad members
Law, Justice and Parliamentary Affairs ministers of Bangladesh
People from Kasba Upazila